Meganisi (Greek: Μεγανήσι, literally "big island") is a Greek island and municipality immediately to the east-southeast of the island of Lefkada. The municipality includes the offshore islands of Skorpios (pop. 2 persons) and Sparti. The municipality has an area of 22.356 km2. Its total population was 1,041 at the 2011 census.

The island has three villages: the central village of Katomeri (pop. 492) and the ports of Vathy (145) and Spartochori (453 inhabitants). There is also a harbour at Atheni Bay used mainly by fishing boats. Meganisi is connected with Lefkada by a car ferry service from Vathy and Spartochori. Meganisi has a school, a lyceum (middle school), an ATM, churches and a few squares (plateies). The island has no secondary school, so pupils attend the nearby school in Nydri, on Lefkada.

Some researchers, including Wilhelm Dörpfeld estimate that Meganisi was the Homeric island of Krocylea, which was part of Odysseus' kingdom.

Municipality

Municipal districts
Katomeri
Spartochori
Vathy

Islands
Skorpios - private island
Sparti

Historical population

See also
List of settlements in the Lefkada regional unit

References

Islands of Greece
Islands of the Ionian Islands (region)
Municipalities of the Ionian Islands (region)
Populated places in Lefkada (regional unit)
Landforms of Lefkada (regional unit)